This is a list of governors of the Huila Department from 1905.

References

List
Huila